Agnès Matoko is a Romanian model of paternal Congolese descent. She is the niece of the famous Congolese general Bouissa Matoko. Her father is official treasurer of the Republic of the Congo. Matoko graduated from Bucharest Academy of Economic Studies.

Matoko has starred in some music videos of Arsenie, Morandi, Pepe or Keo.

References 

People from Bacău
Living people
Romanian people of Republic of the Congo descent
Year of birth missing (living people)